Kağıt kebabı is a type of Turkish kebab peculiar to Hatay province and its administrative capital Antakya.

Kağıt kebabı is made from tomatoes, peppers, minced meat and spices. It is made using baking paper (kağıt) in an oven to trap the juices and flavours inside.

See also
 List of kebabs

References

Kebabs
Turkish cuisine